Bernarda Ćutuk (born 22 December 1990) is a Croatian volleyball player. She is a member of the Croatia women's national volleyball team and played for SC Potsdam in 2014.

She was part of the Croatian national team at the 2014 FIVB Volleyball Women's World Championship in Italy.

Clubs
  Mladost Zagreb (2006–2011)
  ŽOK Rijeka (2011–2012)
  SC Potsdam (2012–2015)

References

External links
http://worldgrandprix.2015.fivb.com/en/preliminary-round-group2/competition/teams/cro-croatia/players/bernarda-cutuk?id=44196
http://italy2014.fivb.org/en/competition/teams/cro-croatia/players/bernarda-cutuk?id=41669
http://www.scoresway.com/?sport=volleyball&page=player&id=6420
 
http://www.volejbalolomouc.cz/bernarda-cutuk-c-7/ 
http://www.parlandodisport.it/2016/03/02/liu-jo-modena-ingaggiata-la-centrale-bernarda-cutuk/
https://www.youtube.com/watch?v=urv34zZ3bzU

1990 births
Living people
Croatian women's volleyball players
Place of birth missing (living people)
Croatian expatriate sportspeople in Germany
Expatriate volleyball players in Germany
Mediterranean Games bronze medalists for Croatia
Mediterranean Games medalists in volleyball
Competitors at the 2013 Mediterranean Games
Expatriate volleyball players in the Czech Republic
Croatian expatriate volleyball players